Toolinna Rockhole is a rockhole on the Nullarbor Plain in southern Western Australia. The explorer Edward John Eyre is thought to have visited it on 2 May 1842, but found it empty.

See also
Toolinna Cove

References
 Toolinna Rockhole at the Gazetteer of Australia online
 

Nullarbor Plain